The rial was the currency of Morocco between 1882 and 1921. It was subdivided into 10 dirham, each of 50 mazunas.

History
The rial was introduced when Morocco adopted a modern style coinage in 1882. It replaced a system consisting of copper falus, silver dirham and gold benduqi.

In Spanish Morocco, the rial was replaced by the Spanish peseta in 1912 at a rate of 1 rial = 5 pesetas. In French Morocco, the rial was replaced in 1921 by the franc at a rate of 1 rial = 10 francs.

Coins
In 1882, silver , 1, 2 and 5 dirham and 1 rial coins were issued whilst, in 1902, bronze 1, 2, 5 and 10 mazunas were introduced. Although there were several design changes, these denominations remained otherwise unchanged until 1921.

Banknotes
The only paper money issued denominated in rial were issued by the State Bank of Morocco between 1910 and 1917. These were also denominated in francs, with denominations of 4 rials (40 francs) and 20 rials (200 francs).

See also

 Falus
 Moroccan Dirham

References

Currencies of Africa
Modern obsolete currencies
Economic history of Morocco
1882 establishments in Morocco
1921 disestablishments
Currencies of Morocco